The Wooing of Eve or Journey into Adventure is a 1926 German silent film directed by Max Mack and starring Ossi Oswalda, Willy Fritsch and Agnes Esterhazy.

The film's sets were designed by the art director Rudi Feld. It was shot at the Weissensee Studios in Berlin.

Cast
Ossi Oswalda as Ossi Bondy
Willy Fritsch as Adam Bondy, Ossi's brother
Agnes Esterhazy as Eva Frieson
Lydia Potechina as Eva's mother
Warwick Ward as F. W. Erler, writer
Adolphe Engers as Bobby
Gyula Szőreghy as Bondy's servant

References

External links

Films of the Weimar Republic
German silent feature films
Films directed by Max Mack
UFA GmbH films
German black-and-white films
1920s German films
Films shot at Weissensee Studios